Gulf carrier can refer to:

An airline based in a country along the Persian Gulf, but typically used to refer to the three major carriers:
Emirates (airline), based in Dubai, United Arab Emirates
Etihad Airways, based in Abu Dhabi, United Arab Emirates
Qatar Airways, based in Doha, Qatar
Others with considerable operations in the same region:
Gulf Air, based in Bahrain
Kuwait Airways, based in Kuwait City, Kuwait
Oman Air, based in Muscat, Oman